L. glaber  may refer to:
 Lithocarpus glaber, a tree species found in Japan
 Lotus glaber, the narrow-leaf bird's-foot trefoil, a flowering plant species native to western and southern Europe and southwest Asia

See also
 Glaber (disambiguation)